Wiszowate  is a village in the administrative district of Gmina Grabowo, within Kolno County, Podlaskie Voivodeship, in north-eastern Poland.
The village has a population of 155.

History
Village founded before 1424. Family nest of noble (szlachta) family of Wiszowaty (branch using the "Abdank" coat-of-arms). The family still lives there. In 15th century members of the family founded another two villages of the same name: Wyszowate in Podlaskie Voivodeship and Wyszowate in Warmian-Masurian Voivodeship.

References

Wiszowate